Seonjeongneung station is a Seoul Subway station on the Suin-Bundang Line and Seoul Subway Line 9. The Bundang Line portion opened October 2012. The station is named after the nearby Seonjeongneung, the Joseon Dynasty royal tombs Seolleung (선릉, 宣陵) and Jeongneung (정릉, 靖陵). It became a transfer station with Seoul Subway Line 9 on March 28, 2015.

Station layout

Line 9

Suin-Bundang Line

Gallery

References

Seoul Metropolitan Subway stations
Metro stations in Gangnam District
Railway stations opened in 2012